Wayra Q'asa (Quechua wayra wind, q'asa mountain pass, "wind pass", also spelled Huayra Khasa) is a mountain in the Bolivian Andes which reaches a height of approximately . It is located in the Chuquisaca Department, Jaime Zudáñez Province, Icla Municipality. Wayra Q'asa lies southwest of Chullunkhäni. The Lampasar River originates at the mountain. It is a left tributary of the Pillku Mayu ("red river").

References 

Mountains of Chuquisaca Department